Stacy Ann "Fergie" Ferguson (born March 27, 1975), is an American singer and rapper. She first achieved chart success as part of the hip hop group the Black Eyed Peas. Her debut solo album, The Dutchess (2006), saw commercial success and spawned three Billboard Hot 100 number one singles: "London Bridge", "Glamorous", and "Big Girls Don't Cry". Although she vocally incorporates rapping into some of her performances, she does not consider herself a rapper.

Fergie was originally a member of the children's television series Kids Incorporated and the girl group Wild Orchid. In 2001, she left the group and in the subsequent year joined the Black Eyed Peas. She worked with the Black Eyed Peas on two albums before releasing her debut solo album, The Dutchess, in 2006. She continued her collaboration with the Black Eyed Peas and released a further two albums with them, The E.N.D. (2009) and The Beginning (2010). Her second solo album, Double Dutchess, was released in 2017.

Fergie has additionally appeared in various films, including Poseidon (2006), Grindhouse (2007), and Nine (2009). She launched her first fragrance, Outspoken, under Avon in May 2010 and has since released four more fragrances. Her footwear line, Fergie Footwear, was launched in 2009.

Early life
Ferguson was born in Hacienda Heights, California, to Terri (née Gore) and Jon Patrick Ferguson. Her father died in September 2021 at age 74. She has a younger sister named Dana Ferguson. Her ancestry includes English, Irish, Mexican, and Scottish. She was raised Roman Catholic and attended Mesa Robles Middle School and Glen A. Wilson High School. She was a cheerleader, straight-A student, spelling bee champion, and Girl Scout.

Career

1984–2002: Television, acting and Wild Orchid
Fergie studied dance and began to do voiceover work; she provided the voice for Sally in two made-for-television Peanuts cartoons, It's Flashbeagle, Charlie Brown (1984) and Snoopy's Getting Married, Charlie Brown (1985), as well as on four episodes of The Charlie Brown and Snoopy Show. From 1984 to 1989, she starred on the TV show Kids Incorporated and was the longest running cast member; she starred in the first six of the show's nine seasons. Fergie was a member of the female trio Wild Orchid, which she fronted with Stefanie Ridel and fellow Kids Incorporated star Renee Sandstrom. By 1992, the girls began meeting with record labels, but they still could not get a recording contract. They eventually signed a music publishing deal with Sony Publishing before signing a record contract with RCA Records in 1994. In April 2007, she gave an interview in which she admitted that she went on a sex and drugs spree when she turned eighteen, saying: "I have had lesbian experiences in the past. I won't say how many men I've had sex with—but I am a very sexual person."

Wild Orchid released their self-titled debut album in March 1997, which debuted at #153 on the Billboard 200. In September 1998, they released their second album, Oxygen, which was a commercial failure, only selling 200,000 copies worldwide. From June 16 to August 28, 1999, they opened for Cher's Do You Believe? tour alongside Cyndi Lauper, which took them to 52 cities across the United States and Canada. They completed a third album, which their record label declined to release, and Fergie left the group in September 2001. In 2006, Fergie told Entertainment Weekly that both frustrations with the band's image and personal drug problems led her to leave Wild Orchid.

2003–2006: Success with the Black Eyed Peas

The Black Eyed Peas were recording their third album, Elephunk (2003), when will.i.am invited Fergie to try out for a song called "Shut Up". She secured the gig and instantly bonded with the trio, going on to record five additional songs on the album. The following spring, shortly before Elephunk came out, Interscope chairman Jimmy Iovine offered Fergie a permanent spot to take over vocal duties and fill the void left by background singer Kim Hill's departure in 2000. In a positive review of the Black Eyed Peas' new-found style, Rolling Stone noted that since 2002, when the group "hired a blond bombshell named Stacy "Fergie" Ferguson and gave up their pursuit of backpack-rapper cred, they have made a kind of spiritual practice of recording futuristic songs – a total aesthetic commitment that extends from their garish wardrobes to their United Colors of Benetton worldview." From Elephunk came "Where is the Love?", which became the Black Eyed Peas' first major hit: it peaked at number eight on the Billboard Hot 100 and topped the charts in several other countries. The album subsequently spawned "Shut Up", which topped the charts in many markets. The third single from the album, "Hey Mama", reached the top 10 in several European countries and later peaked at number twenty-three in the United States in 2004.

Their next album, Monkey Business, was released on June 7, 2005, and debuted at number two on the U.S. Billboard 200 albums chart, selling over 295,000 copies in its first week and was later certified triple platinum by the RIAA. Their next and last commercially released single from the album was "Pump It", which borrows much of its sound from "Misirlou", specifically Dick Dale's version; it peaked at number 8 in Australia but 18 in America. The album's first single, "Don't Phunk with My Heart", was a hit in the United States, reaching number three on the U.S. Hot 100 and earned them another Grammy for Best Rap Performance by a Duo or Group. "Don't Lie", the second single from the album, saw success on the U.S. Hot 100, reaching No. 14, although becoming somewhat more successful in the UK and Australia, reaching a peak of No.6 in both countries. "My Humps", another song from the album, immediately achieved commercial success in the U.S. and fairly substantial radio play despite the sexually suggestive lyrics, reaching number three on the U.S. Hot 100 and number one in Australia, making it their fourth Australian number one single. However, many mocked the song for its poor lyrical content; John Bush, writing for AllMusic, described it as "one of the most embarrassing rap performances of the new millennium". Later in 2005, the Black Eyed Peas toured with Gwen Stefani, as supporting act. In December 2005, they embarked on the "European Tour". In March 2006, the Black Eyed Peas toured again, as the featured headliner for the Honda Civic Tour.

2006–2008: The Dutchess

Fergie's debut solo album, The Dutchess, was released in September 2006. It was initially recorded in 2005. The songs on the album are "from a seven-year period, but [Interscope CEO] Jimmy Iovine heard some [tracks] and was like, 'This is great, let's put it out'. One of the album's executive producers and fellow Black Eyed Peas member will.i.am stated that she was "writing about her personal struggles and casting her demons away and feminine power. [It's] her singing for young girls to be strong, and what they're going through in life, just growing up in this world of uncertainty." "London Bridge" was released as the album's lead single on July 18, 2006, to radio stations and on August 7, 2006, on the iTunes Store. The urban pop track caused controversy due to its double entendre title, but became a huge success, topping the Billboard Hot 100 (for three weeks) and New Zealand charts, while also reaching the top-ten in over twelve countries. The music video for the song features the Black Eyed Peas members as well as Fergie on the Tower Bridge, among other scenes.

The following single, "Fergalicious", was released on October 23, 2006. The track, which features will.i.am, managed to reach number two on the Billboard Hot 100, the top-five in Australia and New Zealand, although it peaked lower than "London Bridge" in Europe. Its music video features Fergie as Willy Wonka in a candy factory. "Glamorous" was released as the third single from the album, on February 20, 2007. The track, which features Ludacris, became another number-one single for Fergie in the United States, and also reached the top-ten in over seven countries. The fourth single, "Big Girls Don't Cry", was released on May 22, 2007. The ballad became a huge success worldwide, topping the charts of ten countries, including Australia, Canada and the United States; it was also the album's most successful single in Europe. The music video for the song features American actor Milo Ventimiglia as her love interest. "Clumsy" was then selected to be the fifth and final single of the album. It was released on September 25, 2007 and became a top-ten hit in five countries, including in Australia and the United States, becoming her fifth consecutive top-five hit in the U.S.

In December 2007, Blender picked Fergie as their woman of the year. In 2007, the Black Eyed Peas embarked on the Black Blue & You World Tour and visited more than 20 countries. Fergie returned to acting in 2006, appearing as a lounge singer in the Poseidon remake. She later had supporting roles in 2007's Grindhouse and the 2009 musical film Nine. Fergie and other members of the cast of Nine received a Screen Actors Guild Award for Outstanding Performance by a Cast in a Motion Picture nomination for their performance in that film. On December 31, 2006, Fergie began hosting Dick Clark's New Year's Rockin' Eve on ABC for the pre-taped Hollywood segments after the New Year Ball came down in Times Square. In 2008, Fergie signed a deal with Brown Shoe to create a licensed footwear brand.

2009–2012: Continued success with the Black Eyed Peas

In early 2009, Fergie and the group left A&M Records; both remained with Interscope Records. The group's fifth studio album, The E.N.D ("The Energy Never Dies"), was released on June 9, 2009. The overall sound of the album has a more electro hop beat rather than the usual hip pop/R&B feeling of their previous albums. In its first week, the album sold 304,000 copies and debuted at number 1 on the Billboard 200. They released "Boom Boom Pow" as the lead single from their fifth album, The E.N.D., in March 2009. It went to number one in the United States and became the group's first chart topper. As of March 2011, the album has sold over 3,000,000 copies in the US alone. In France, the album proved to be very successful. It spent 55 weeks inside of the top 10 with 11 at No. 1. They subsequently released a second single from the album, "I Gotta Feeling", which proved an even greater success than the first: it moved from number two behind "Boom Boom Pow" to the top spot in July, and stayed for 14 straight weeks at number one on the Billboard Hot 100, the longest stay at the top of 2009. The two hit singles back to back kept the Black Eyed Peas on the top for 26 consecutive weeks, from April 18 through October 16. Fergie bought a stake in the Miami Dolphins in 2009, and has performed at the team's football games numerous times.

"Meet Me Halfway" was released as the third single from the album in September 2009. The single reached number one in the United Kingdom and Australia. It also peaked at seven on the Billboard Hot 100. In October 2009, Fergie became a part owner of the National Football League's Miami Dolphins. "Imma Be" was released as the fourth single; it reached number one on the Billboard Hot 100 for two weeks. "Rock That Body" was then released as the fifth single and reached number nine on the U.S. charts. In September 2009, the group embarked on The E.N.D World Tour, visiting Japan, Thailand, Malaysia, Australia and New Zealand. In October 2009, they also were the opening acts for 5 concerts of the U2 360° Tour North America leg. The group performed at the Grammys on January 31, 2010. They performed a mash-up of "Imma Be"/"I Gotta Feeling". They won 3 out of the 6 awards they were nominated for including Best Pop Vocal Album for The E.N.D., Best Pop VocalPerformance by a Group for "I Gotta Feeling" and Best Short Form Video for "Boom Boom Pow". On July 27, 2010, the Black Eyed Peas released a remix album: The E.N.D. Summer 2010 Canadian Invasion Tour: Remix Collection. It was released on iTunes in Canada only, during the Canadian leg of The E.N.D World Tour. It mostly features remixes of the singles taken from The E.N.D. It also features a remix of "Let's Get It Started" taken from Elephunk; the remix was also a bonus track on the deluxe edition of The E.N.D.. She launched her debut fragrance, Outspoken, under Avon in May 2010. Her performance of Gimme Shelter with Mick Jagger and U2 at the Rock and Roll Hall of Fame 25th Anniversary in 2010 has over 13 million views.

Their sixth studio album, The Beginning, was released on November 30, 2010, and received mixed reviews. The album's first single release was called "The Time (Dirty Bit)". In January 2011, she began appearing in Dr Pepper Cherry commercials. "Just Can't Get Enough", the album's second single, was released on February 18, 2011. The music video was released on March 16, 2011, and it was filmed in Tokyo, one week before the earthquake and the tsunami. The video was directed by Ben Mor. The group's third single was "Don't Stop the Party" and it was released on May 10, 2011. On the same day, a music video for the song was released on iTunes, along with the single. The video, which is directed by Ben Mor, features on stage and backstage footage of the group during The E.N.D. World Tour in 2009–10. The video premiered on Vevo on May 12, 2011. On May 22, the group appeared on the 2011 Billboard Music Awards and won 1 of their 4 nominations, for "Top Duo/Group". On the July 6, 2011 during a concert at Alton Towers in Staffordshire, the Black Eyed Peas announced they are taking an indefinite hiatus following the completion of their current tour, as they did between 2005 and 2009. On September 22, Fergie visited Madame Tussauds for the unveiling of her wax figure in Las Vegas, Nevada.

In May 2010, she launched her first fragrance, Outspoken by Fergie, under direct selling beauty and cosmetics company, Avon and release more fragrances in her Outspoken line, including Outspoken Intense in 2011, Viva by Fergie in 2012, Outspoken Fresh in 2013 and Outspoken Party! in 2015. Her tagline to her fragrance line is "Say What You Mean It".

2013–2018: Double Dutchess

In 2013, Fergie announced that she had begun writing her second solo studio album. In April, Fergie received the "Always Next, Forever Now" award from Logo TV in recognition of her work in the LGBT community. The same year, Fergie filed a claim at the Los Angeles County Superior Court to legally change her name to Fergie Duhamel and take the last name of her husband, Josh Duhamel. On January 6, 2014, it was announced, again, that Fergie was beginning the process of her second studio album. She stated in an interview with radio host Ryan Seacrest that will.i.am would be handling the production, with a release through Interscope. In September 2014, it was announced that Fergie's second studio album had been slated for a 2015 release. A new single from Fergie, titled "L.A. Love (La La)", was released to contemporary hit radio on September 30, 2014. The song debuted on the Billboard Hot 100 at number 97 and peaked at number 27. It also reached number 16 on the Rhythmic Songs, number eight on Hot Rap Songs, number 24 on the Digital Songs and number 20 on the Pop Songs radio chart. On April 22, 2015, the singer performed a song with the Black Eyed Peas at the 2015 Coachella Valley Music and Arts Festival as part of David Guetta's set. Fergie announced in June 2015 that she was putting the finishing touches on the album, titled Double Dutchess.

A teaser for the album titled "Hungry (1st Byte)" was released on June 9, 2016. On July 1, she released a new single, titled "M.I.L.F. $". Fergie was inspired to write the song after the birth of her son, Axl. The music video was conceptualized by Fergie and features a group of famous mothers as lingerie-clad 1950s housewives. On November 11, 2016, Fergie released the third single from the album, "Life Goes On". In November 2016, during a live Facebook chat, Fergie confirmed that the album would see its release in 2017. In May 2017, it was announced that Fergie had parted ways—by mutual decision—with Interscope and would launch her own imprint, Dutchess Music, as part of a global partnership with BMG Rights Management. On June 2, 2017, a Billboard article rumored that Fergie was departing from the Black Eyed Peas. Band frontman will.i.am dismissed this, but stated that Fergie was taking a break from the group opting to concentrate on her solo career whilst the remaining members are working on a side project.

The pre-order of Double Dutchess was made available on August 25, 2017, along with instant downloads of "Hungry" and "You Already Know", collaborations with Rick Ross and Nicki Minaj respectively, with the latter being the fourth single from the album. On September 16, 2017, Fergie performed a solo set live from the Rock in Rio stage in Rio de Janeiro for over a hundred thousand people with surprise guests Pabllo Vittar, Sergio Mendes and Gracinha Leporace. Double Dutchess was finally released on September 22, 2017. On February 18, 2018, will.i.am confirmed Fergie's departure from the band in an interview with the Daily Star. At the 2018 NBA All-Star Game, Fergie performed a controversial rendition of "The Star-Spangled Banner", which People described as a "slowed-down jazzy rendition" and Deadline reported it as being "bluesy" and "breathy". She would later acknowledge that "clearly this rendition didn't strike the intended tone."  In 2018, Fergie hosted the singing competition series The Four: Battle for Stardom, which ran for two seasons on Fox. In September 2018, Fergie re-recorded The Wendy Williams Show's theme song "Feel It" to celebrate the show's 10th season.

2019–present: Business ventures 
In March 2019, Fergie visited Toronto, Ontario, Canada to promote her two footwear lines, Fergalicious by Fergie and Fergie Footwear, which became available at Canadian luxury goods department store Hudson's Bay in October 2015. Fergie Footwear is an upscale line, sold at luxury department such as Nordstrom, while Fergalicious by Fergie is sold at a lower price point at outlets such as Famous Footwear stores.

In 2020, Fergie and her father Pat Ferguson's winery Ferguson Crest, which was founded in 2006, released three new wines called 2012 Syrah, 2012 Fergalicious and 2013 Viognier. The wines were named after song lyrics by Fergie and The Black Eyed Peas.

Rapper Jack Harlow's Billboard Hot 100 number one song "First Class", released in April 2022, samples Fergie's song "Glamorous". Variety reported that after Harlow's single release, "Glamorous" had a 70% increase in streams and 125% increase in digital song sales. Harlow and Fergie opened the 2022 MTV Video Music Awards with a live performance of "First Class" marking her first televised performance in four years. New York Post called it one of the best performances of the night.

Public image 
Fergie was signed to Wilhelmina Models from 2007 to 2011. Through Wilhelmina Models, she worked with several brands such as Dsquared, Calvin Klein and Marchesa.

She has graced the cover of numerous lifestyle and fashion magazines such as Marie Claire, Paper, Harper's Bazaar, Cosmopolitan, Lucky, Cleo, Elle, Glamour, Allure, Shape and Seventeen. She has appeared in ad campaigns for Voli, MAC Cosmetics' Viva Glam, C&A Mexico, Candie's and Philipp Plein. She appeared in commercials for Case-Mate, Motorola Rokr U9, Pepsi, Hewlett-Packard, Dr Pepper and Doritos.

In 2010, she became a spokesperson for Avon's haircare line Advanced Techniques, appearing in advertisements and commercials for the brand.

Product lines 
In 2007, Fergie launched two handbag collections for Kipling.

Philanthropy 
Fergie has supported many charity organizations such as Habitat For Humanity, Lopez Family Foundation, Red Cross, Stand Up To Cancer, The Trevor Project and Treatment Action Campaign. In April 2011, Fergie and the Black Eyed Peas teamed up with children's clothing brand P.S. from Aeropostale to design a charity T-shirt that will benefit the band's Peapod Foundation. In 2020, 100 percent of the proceeds from Fergie Footwear's holiday shoe were donated to Dress For Success.

Personal life
Fergie began dating actor Josh Duhamel in September 2004, after she met him when she and the Black Eyed Peas filmed a cameo for an episode of Duhamel's show Las Vegas. Fergie and Duhamel became engaged in December 2007; they married in a Catholic ceremony on January 10, 2009. They have one son who was born on August 29, 2013. On September 14, 2017, Fergie and Duhamel announced that they had separated earlier that year. On June 1, 2019, the couple filed for divorce after two years of separation. The divorce was finalized in November 2019.

Substance abuse
While performing with Wild Orchid, Fergie developed an addiction to crystal methamphetamine, which continued after she left the group in 2001. In September 2006, Fergie talked with Time magazine about quitting her crystal meth addiction. "It was the hardest boyfriend I ever had to break up with," she said. "It's the drug that's addicting. But it's why you start doing it in the first place that's interesting. A lot of it was being a child actor; I learned to suppress feelings." Fergie has stated in several interviews that she is an avid user of hypnotherapy, which she used to overcome her crystal meth addiction and to relax.

Discography

Studio albums
The Dutchess (2006)
Double Dutchess (2017)

Filmography

Film

Television

Tours
Headlining
Verizon VIP Tour (2007)

Opening act
FutureSex/LoveShow (2007)
The Police Reunion Tour (2008)

Awards and nominations

See also
List of celebrities who own wineries and vineyards

References

External links

 
 
 
 
 Children of the World Project
 Fergie Left the Black Eyed Peas
 

 
1975 births
Living people
20th-century American actresses
21st-century American actresses
A&M Records artists
Actresses from California
American actresses of Mexican descent
American child actresses
American women singer-songwriters
American film actresses
American women hip hop singers
American people of Irish descent
American people of Scottish descent
American rappers of Mexican descent
American television actresses
American voice actresses
California Democrats
American women rappers
Grammy Award winners for rap music
Interscope Records artists
People from Hacienda Heights, California
Rappers from Los Angeles
Black Eyed Peas members
Wild Orchid (group) members
20th-century American singers
21st-century American singers
Dance-pop musicians
American women pop singers
Pop rappers
American contemporary R&B singers
21st-century American women singers
American people of English descent
Catholics from California
21st-century American rappers
20th-century American women singers
Singer-songwriters from California
21st-century women rappers